Diama (born 1980), is a Swiss singer.

Diama may also refer to:

 Diama, Senegal, a village in the Dagana Department, Senegal
 Diama, an island in the Louisiade Archipelago of Papua New Guinea
 Diama Maramanikaibau, Fijian athlete, gold medalist at the 2013 Pacific Mini Games
 Drosophila diama, a species of fly in the genus Drosophila
 Qatāda ibn Diʿāma (died 736), hadiths narrator who detailed the Manasik

See also
Diamma, a genus of ants
Diana (disambiguation)